13th Avenue may refer to several places:

Thirteenth Avenue (Brooklyn), the commercial center of Borough Park, Brooklyn
Thirteenth Avenue (Manhattan), a short street in the west side of Manhattan
13th Avenue (BMT Culver Line), a station on the former BMT Culver Line
13th Avenue station (RTD), a train station in Denver, Colorado